Frenchmans Creek is a short tributary of the Darling River in west New South Wales, measuring  from its source south of Pooncarie, New South Wales at an elevation of  to its confluence into the Darling River at an elevation of .

See also

List of rivers of Australia

References

Tributaries of the Darling River